Gleb Savchenko  (born 16 September 1983) is a Russian-American dancer, choreographer, and model, who is currently a professional dancer on the U.S. version of Dancing with the Stars. He previously appeared on the UK, Australian, and Russian versions of the show.

Personal life
Gleb was born in Moscow. He began dancing at 8 years old.

Gleb was married to professional dancer Elena Samodanova, and they have a daughter, Olivia. In March 2017, the couple announced that they were expecting their second child. Their second daughter, Zlata, was born on 1 August 2017. In November 2020, after 14 years of marriage, he and his wife Elena announced that they had decided to part ways.

Dancing with the Stars

Australia
In 2012, Gleb appeared as a professional on the twelfth season of Dancing with the Stars. He was partnered with model Erin McNaught. They were the first couple to be eliminated from the competition, finishing in 11th place.

United States
In 2013, Gleb appeared as a professional on season 16 of Dancing with the Stars. He was partnered with Real Housewives of Beverly Hills star Lisa Vanderpump. They were the second couple to be eliminated from the competition, finishing in 10th place. He also performed as a member of the Troupe in season 17.

Gleb returned as a professional for season 23, where he was partnered with singer and actress Jana Kramer. They reached the finals and finished in fourth place.

For season 24, Savchenko was partnered with singer and The Real Housewives of Beverly Hills star Erika Jayne. They were the fourth couple to be eliminated from the competition, finishing in 9th place. 

For season 25, Savchenko was partnered with Pretty Little Liars actress Sasha Pieterse. They were the fourth couple to be eliminated from the competition, finishing in 10th place.

For season 26, Savchenko was partnered with Notre Dame women's basketball player Arike Ogunbowale. They were eliminated in the second week of competition, tying in 7th place with Kareem Abdul-Jabbar and Lindsay Arnold.

For season 27, Savchenko was paired with comedian Nikki Glaser. They were the first couple to be eliminated from the competition, finishing in 13th place.

For season 28, Savchenko was paired with country music singer Lauren Alaina.  They reached the finals and finished in 4th place.

For season 29, Savchenko was paired with actress and Selling Sunset star Chrishell Stause.  They were eliminated on the eighth week of competition and finished in 8th place.

For season 30, Savchenko was paired with Spice Girls singer Melanie C. They finished in 11th place.

For season 31, Savchenko was paired with drag queen Shangela. They reached the finals and finished in fourth place.

Season 16 – with Lisa Vanderpump

Season 23 – with Jana Kramer

1 Score given by guest judge Pitbull.2 Score given by guest judge Idina Menzel

Season 24 – with Erika Jayne

Season 25 – with Sasha Pieterse

Season 26 – with Arike Ogunbowale

1 Score given by guest judge Rashad Jennings.

Season 27 – with Nikki Glaser

Season 28 – with Lauren Alaina

1 Score given by guest judge Leah Remini.  2 Score given by guest judge Joey Fatone.

Season 29 – with Chrishell Stause

Season 30 – with Melanie C

1 Derek Hough missed that week's live show, so scores were out of 30.

Season 31 – with Shangela

1 Score awarded by guest judge Michael Bublé.

Russia

In 2015, Savchenko appeared as a professional on the ninth season of Танцы со звёздами. He was partnered with figure skater Adelina Sotnikova. They reached the finals and finished in second place.

Strictly Come Dancing

In 2015, Savchenko became a professional dancer on Strictly Come Dancing for its thirteenth series. He was partnered with television presenter, Anita Rani. They were eliminated during the semi-finals of the competition, finishing in fifth place.

Gleb announced he would not be returning to Strictly Come Dancing in 2016.

Other shows 
In 2013, while partnered with partner Lisa Vanderpump, Savchenko appeared on the first and second episode of the fourth season of The Real Housewives of Beverly Hills at a Dinner Party after the first show along with Lisa's castmates.

In 2016, Savchenko took part in the British television cooking show Celebrity MasterChef. 
In August 2018, Savchenko took part in Celebs on the Farm. He became the first winner of the series.

In January 2023, he appeared as himself and as the best man in Dancing with the Stars co-star Artem Chigvintsev's and Nikki Bella's four-part wedding series, Nikki Bella Says I Do on the E! network.

Awards and achievements

References

1983 births
Living people
Participants in American reality television series
Dancers from Moscow